Uruguay competed at the 2004 Summer Paralympics in Athens, Greece. The team included three athletes,  but won no medals.

Sports

Athletics

Judo

See also
Uruguay at the Paralympics
Uruguay at the 2004 Summer Olympics

References 

Nations at the 2004 Summer Paralympics
2004
Summer Paralympics